Radwimps (stylized as RADWIMPS) is Japanese rock band Radwimps' debut album under independent label Newtraxx, released on July 2, 2003.

Background and development 
The band first created a different album also called Radwimps in June 2002, selling copies at live concerts for 500 yen. It featured the songs "Aoi Haru", "Iyan", "Shinzō", "Moshi mo" and "Aimai", which were all included on their debut album.

The album was preceded by the single "Moshi mo," which was the song that lead the band to win the Yokohama High School Music Festival in 2002. 10,000 copies were pressed and sold for 100 yen each. Following this single, the band toured the Yokohama area, including a performance as the sole act at Yokohama's Club 24West. The band released Radwimps in July through independent label Newtraxx, featuring songs written by the band in middle school.

In August 2003, the band went on hiatus for vocalist Yojiro Noda and other members to focus on their school exams. When the band returned in 2004, members Yūsuke Saiki, Kei Asō and Akio Shibafuji were no longer a part of the group, making this album the only with Radwimps' original line-up.

Commercial reception 

The album did not chart on Oricon's top 300 albums chart until August 2006. The album was a very gradual seller, charting for 98 weeks and peaking at number 86. The album reached this peak in early 2007 and has only spent a single week in the top 100. In March 2008, the album was certified gold by the RIAJ.

Track listing

Chart rankings

Sales and certifications

Release history

References

2003 albums
Radwimps albums